USS H-4 (SS-147) was a H-class submarine originally built for the Imperial Russian Navy. Six of these were not delivered pending the outcome of the Russian Revolution of 1917 before being purchased by the United States Navy on 20 May 1918.

Description
They displaced  on the surface and  submerged. The boats had a crew of 2 officers and 23 enlisted men.

For surface running, they were powered by two New London Ship & Engine Co.  diesel engines, each driving one propeller shaft. When submerged each propeller was driven by a  Electro Dynamic Co. electric motor. They could reach  on the surface and  underwater.

The boats were armed with four 18-inch (450 mm) torpedo tubes in the bow. They carried four reloads, for a total of eight torpedoes.

Construction and career

H-4 was launched on 9 October 1918, and commissioned on 24 October 1918. Stationed at San Pedro, California — first with Submarine Division 6 (SubDiv 6) and then SubDiv 7 — H-4 participated in various battle and training exercises along the West Coast with her sister H-boats. These exercises were interrupted by occasional patrol duty off Santa Catalina Island and periodic overhauls at Mare Island.

In company with the two sub divisions and tender , H-4 sailed from San Pedro on 25 July 1922 and reached Norfolk, Virginia on 14 September via Magdalena Bay, Corinto, and Coco Solo. She decommissioned there on 25 October. H-4 was struck from the Naval Vessel Register on 26 February 1931 and sold for scrap on 14 September.

Notes

References

External links

United States H-class submarines
World War I submarines of the United States
Ships built in Bremerton, Washington
1918 ships
Russian Empire–United States relations